Arthur George Murcell (30 October 1925 – 3 December 1998) was a British character actor.

Life and career
Born in Italy, he made his film debut in Michael Powell and Emeric Pressburger's The Battle of the River Plate (1956), Murcell went on to develop a career playing snarling villains in both film and television. These could either be stupid, brutish henchmen, as in Hell Drivers and Campbell's Kingdom (both 1957), or sophisticated rogues, such as Needle in "You Have Just Been Murdered", an episode of The Avengers.

He specialised in playing foreign characters, including Germans, Russians and South Americans. A number of these roles were in ITC adventure TV series of the 1960s and 1970s, such as Danger Man, The Baron, The Saint, The Champions (Reply Box No.666 episode, 1967) Randall and Hopkirk (Deceased), The Persuaders! and Jason King. His film roles included Sea of Sand (1958), The Fall of the Roman Empire (1964), The Heroes of Telemark (1965), Kaleidoscope (1966), The Fixer (1968), A Dandy in Aspic (1968), The Assassination Bureau (1969), A Walk with Love and Death (1969), Penny Gold (1973), Special Branch (1974), Inside the Third Reich (1982, as Hermann Göring), Year of the Gun (1991), and Cutthroat Island (1995).

He enjoyed a long stage career, which involved working with Tyrone Guthrie and Peter Brook, and was active in the Royal Shakespeare Company. In the 1970s, he acquired a Victorian church in North London, which he converted into an Elizabethan-style theatre in collaboration with director Adrian Brown. In 1973, he opened it as "St George's Theatre", intending that it present little-seen classical plays. 

Throughout the 1970s and 1980s, he continued to work at St George's Theatre as both an actor and a director, often with his wife, Elvi Hale.

Personal life

Murcell married his first wife, Josephine Tweedy, in 1953. His second wife was the British actress Elvi Hale, to whom he was married from 1961 until his death in 1998. Away from acting, Murcell was also an accomplished musician and linguist. He died on 3 December 1998, aged 73. A bench dedicated to him is placed near the bridge crossing the lake at Kew Gardens.

Filmography

Silent Witness (1953) – Policeman (uncredited)
The Battle of the River Plate (1956) – Chief Officer, Newton Beach (uncredited)
High Tide at Noon (1957) – Ash Breck (uncredited)
The Steel Bayonet (1957) – Warren
Hell Drivers (1957) – Tub
Campbell's Kingdom (1957) – Max
Blood of the Vampire (1958) – First Guard
Sea Fury (1958) – Loudon
Sea of Sand (1958) – Cpl. Simms
Jet Storm (1959) – Saunders
Don't Panic Chaps! (1959) – Meister
The Angry Silence (1960) – Jones
Crossroads to Crime (1960) – Diamond
The Pursuers (1961) – Freddy
In Search of the Castaways (1962) – Ayerton's Assistant
The Fall of the Roman Empire (1964) – Victorinus
The Heroes of Telemark (1965) – Sturmfuhrer
Kaleidoscope (1966) – Johnny
You Only Live Twice (1967) – Russian Diplomat (uncredited)
A Dandy in Aspic (1968) – Sgt Harris
The Fixer (1968) – Deputy Warden
The Assassination Bureau (1969) – Zeppelin pilot (uncredited)
A Walk with Love and Death (1969) – The Captain
The Horsemen (1971) – Mizrar
Si può essere più bastardi dell'ispettore Cliff? (1963)
Penny Gold (1973) – Doctor Merrick
Rime of the Ancient Mariner (1975) – William Wordsworth (voice)
Penelope Pulls It Off (1975) – Owen
Inside the Third Reich (1982) – Hermann Göring
The Blind Side of God (1987)
Year of the Gun (1991) – Pierre Bernier
The Assassinator (1992) – Colonel Bradley
Cutthroat Island (1995) – Mordachai Fingers

References

External links
 
 

1925 births
1998 deaths
20th-century British male actors
20th-century British musicians
British male film actors
Linguists from the United Kingdom
British male musicians
British male stage actors
British male television actors
British theatre directors
Royal Shakespeare Company members
British male Shakespearean actors
20th-century linguists
People from Naples
20th-century male musicians